Maria Zinovievna Hrebinetska (1883 – 15 August 1972) was a Ukrainian and Ukrainian-American theater actress and singer (soprano). She is known for her performances at the Mykola Sadovsky Theater, Odesa Opera House, and the Ruska Besida Theater in Lviv.

Life 
Maria Hrebinetska was born in 1883 in Kyiv. From 1905 to 1907, she studied at Mykola Lysenko Music and Drama School under Oleksandr Myszuga. Hrebinetska was considered one of the most outstanding singers at Lysenko School. On the recommendation of Oleksandr Myszuga, Hrebinetska went to Milan to improve her skills and studied singing there from 1907 to 1911.

Career 
After graduating in 1911, Hrebinetska became a soloist at the Odesa Opera House, making her debut in the part of Oksana in the opera Zaporozhets za Dunayem by Semen Gulak-Artemovsky. She worked as a soloist at the Odesa Opera House until 1912. In 1914, Hrebinetska became a soloist of the Mykola Sadovsky Theater in Kyiv where she sang all the soprano parts. When Sadovsky's theater moved to Lviv in 1920 and soon ceased its activities, Hrebinetska was an artist of the Russian National Theater for some time.

In 1922, she joined the Ukrainian National Chorus under the direction of Oleksandr Koshyts'. Hrebinetska traveled with the Chorus to the United States in 1922 and toured with them until 1924. Her brother Mykhailo Hrebinetsky also performed in the Chorus.

From 1923 to 1928, Hrebinetska sang in People's House in New York (1923-1928). In 1931, Hrebinetska joined a violinist Roman Prydatkevych and pianist Alisa Korchak to form the ensemble "Ukrainian Trio" in New York City. She remained the soloist of the ensemble “Ukrainian Trio” until 1934.

In the 1930s, Hrebinetska married Nestor Novovirskyi.

In 1941, she graduated from the Washington Irving Evening High School in New York City with a Gold Medal for Scholarship, awarded annually to the highest ranking student of the graduating class. Thanks to this scholarship she could attend Hunter College, from which she graduated in 1949.

For nearly 20 years, Hrebinetska taught voice and piano in New York City at the Ukrainian National Home and at the studio of the Surma Book and Music Company that she co-founded in 1944.

Maria Hrebinetska died on 15 August 1972 in New York.

References 

1883 births
1972 deaths
Ukrainian stage actresses
20th-century Ukrainian actresses
20th-century Ukrainian singers
Ukrainian SSR emigrants to the United States